Auļi is a Latvian folk/world music band formed in 2003. The band consists of 6 bagpipers, 3 drummers and 1 electric cello player.

History 
In 2005, Auļi released their 12-track debut album Sendzirdēju. In 2010, the band released their third studio album titled Etnotranss (Ethno trance), a term they created to describe their music. The album features Andris Grunte on double bass.

On May 4, 2013, Auļi performed a 10-year anniversary concert at Palladium Riga. The same month the band released a best of album Dižducis with 12 of their previously released compositions, re-arranged by multi-instrumentalist Kārlis Auzāns and joined by Juris Kaukulis from Dzelzs Vilks, folk singer Zane Šmite, Madagascarian musician Kilema (vocals and valiha) and other guest musicians.

In 2016, Auļi released their fifth studio album Gadalokos with compositions about the Latvian seasons (Sala laiks, Sērsnu laiks, Pavasara laiks, Ziedu laiks, Siena laiks, Rudens laiks, Veļu laiks and Ledus laiks) and celebrations (Meteņi, Lieldienas, Ūsiņi, Jāņi, Māras, Apjumības, Mārtiņi, Ziemassvētki and Pieguļa). The album was inspired by a calendar pendant found in an 1999–2000 archaeological excavation in Tukums.

In 2017, Auļi together with Tautumeitas released a 13-track album Lai māsiņa rotājās! dedicated to engagements and weddings. The album received Annual Latvian Music Recording Award as the Best Folk music album of 2017. Lai māsiņa rotājās! also reached position No. 26 in the 2018 World Music Charts Europe, as well as No. 38 in the April 2018 and May 2018 Transglobal World Music Chart.

In 2019, Auļi released a 12 song album Senĉu Balsis: Voices of the Ancestors featuring four guest musicians (Batzorig Vaanchig, Albin Paulus, Kai Somby, and Edgars Lipors) each representing a distinctive singing style (Tuvan throat singing, yodeling, joiking, and traditional Latvian singing). Two months after the release of the studio album Auļi released a live concert recording of this album called Voices of the Ancestors (Live at GORS, Rēzekne, 2019).

In 2020, Auļi released a COVID-19 inspired remote performance single alongside many other drummers and bagpipe players called Alšvangas dūdu meldiņš. This performance was released 10 May 2020 amidst the COVID-19 pandemic.

In 2021, Auļi released a 12-composition instrumental album Visapkārt ("Immersive") using Dolby Atmos surround sound technology.

Members 
 Kaspars Bārbals — dūdas, pipe, bombard and drums
 Leanne Barbo — torupill and jew's harp
 Gatis Valters — ģīga and drums
 Māris Jēkabsons — dūdas and vocals
 Edgars Kārklis — dūdas
 Normunds Vaivads — dūdas
 Gatis Indrēvics — dūdas and bombard
 Mikus Čavarts — percussion instruments
 Edgars Krūmiņš — drums
 Kaspars Indrēvics — tree trunk drums

Discography 
 Sendzirdēju (2005)
 Auļos... (2007)
 Etnotranss (2010)
 Dižducis (2013)
 Gadalokos (2016)
 Lai māsiņa rotājās! (2017; with Tautumeitas)
 Senču balsis (2019)
 Voices of the Ancestors (Live at GORS, Rēzekne, 2019)
 Visapkārt (2021)

References

External links 
Official website 

2003 establishments in Latvia
Latvian folk music groups
Latvian world music groups
Musical groups established in 2003